Il sagrifizio di Jefte is a 1795 oratorio by Simon Mayr to a libretto by Giuseppe Foppa performed in Forlì.

Recordings
 Il sagrifizio di Jefte. Franz Hauk. 2CD Naxos

References

1795 compositions
Oratorios by Simon Mayr